Ratnawica  (Ratnavytsia) is a former village in the administrative district of Gmina Bukowsko, within Sanok County, Subcarpathian Voivodeship, in south-eastern Poland.

References

Ratnawica